Clarkstown is a town in Rockland County, New York, United States. The town is on the eastern border of the county, located north of the town of Orangetown, east of the town of Ramapo, south of the town of Haverstraw, and west of the Hudson River. As of the 2020 census, the town had a total population of 86,855. The hamlet of New City, the county seat of Rockland County, is also the seat of town government and of the Clarkstown Police Department, the county sheriff's office, and the county correctional facility. New City makes up about 41.47% of the town's population.

In 2008, Clarkstown became one of 600 municipalities nationwide to sign the United States Mayor's Climate Protection Agreement to reduce carbon dioxide emissions to 7 percent below the 1990 levels by 2012.

History 

The town of Clarkstown was created in 1791 from the town of Haverstraw in Orange County, before Rockland County was formed.

Geography

The Hudson River defines the eastern border of the town, which is opposite the town of Mount Pleasant in Westchester County.

The New York State Thruway (Interstate 87/Interstate 287) intersects the Palisades Interstate Parkway in the town.

Demographics

As of the 2010 Census, there were 84,187 people, 29,234 households, and 22,186 families residing in the Town of Clarkstown. The population density was 1,800 per square mile. There were 30,314 housing units at an average density of 646.35 per square mile. There were 29,234 households, out of which 27.9% had children under the age of 18 living with them, 62.1% were married couples living together, 10.4% had a female householder with no husband present, and 24.1% were non-families. 36.2% of all households were made up of individuals, and 31.8% had someone living alone who was 65 years of age of older. The average household size was 2.84 and the average family size was 3.28. The median age was 42.8 years. 

As of the census of 2000, there were 82,082 people, 27,697 households, and 21,991 families residing in the town.  The population density was 2,129.7 people per square mile (822.3/km2).  There were 28,220 housing units at an average density of 732.2 per square mile (282.7/km2).  The racial makeup of the town was 79.97% White, 7.87% African American, 0.13% Native American, 7.90% Asian, 0.10% Pacific Islander, 1.99% from other races, and 2.03% from two or more races. Hispanic or Latino of any race were 6.92% of the population.

There were 27,697 households, out of which 36.9% had children under the age of 18 living with them, 67.4% were married couples living together, 9.1% had a female householder with no husband present, and 20.6% were non-families. 16.9% of all households were made up of individuals, and 6.5% had someone living alone who was 65 years of age or older.  The average household size was 2.90 and the average family size was 3.27.

In the town, the population was spread out, with 24.7% under the age of 18, 6.6% from 18 to 24, 28.3% from 25 to 44, 28.1% from 45 to 64, and 12.3% who were 65 years of age or older.  The median age was 39 years. For every 100 females, there were 94.3 males.  For every 100 females age 18 and over, there were 90.3 males.

According to a 2007 estimate, the median income for a household in the town was $92,121, and the median income for a family was $104,909. Males had a median income of $57,773 versus $40,805 for females. The per capita income for the town was $34,430.  About 2.5% of families and 3.8% of the population were below the poverty line, including 4.5% of those under age 18 and 3.4% of those age 65 or over.

As of the 2020 Census, there were 86,855 people residing in the Town of Clarkstown.

Clarkstown is the most densely populated town in Rockland County and is home to New City, which is the county seat. Clarkstown has more business districts in it than any other town in Rockland County, including the Palisades Center, which is among the largest malls in the world.

Elected representation
The Town of Clarkstown has as its chief executive a Town Supervisor.  The current Town Supervisor is George Hoehmann.  Clarkstown is represented in the United States House of Representatives by Congressman Michael Lawler.  It is represented in New York State government by Senator Bill Weber and Assemblyman Kenneth Zebrowski Jr. Clarkstown is divided into four wards as follows:

Ward 1 Councilman Frank Borelli
encompasses the northern portion of New City.
Ward 2 Councilman Michael Graziano
encompasses the northeast portion of Clarkstown.
Ward 3 Councilman Donald Franchino
encompasses Central Nyack, West Nyack, Nanuet, and Bardonia.
Ward 4 Councilman Patrick Carroll
encompasses Bardonia, New City, Nanuet, Spring Valley and West Nyack.

Public transportation

Clarkstown Mini-Trans is the provider of local mass transportation in Clarkstown. It has five bus routes:

Route A- Nanuet Mall to Lakewood Drive
Route B- Nanuet Mall to Zukor Park
Route C- Nanuet Mall to South Mountain Road
Route D- Nanuet Mall to Palisades Center Mall
Route E- Nanuet Mall to Ridge Road

Additionally, Transport of Rockland provides local mass transportation. Routes 59, 91, 92, 93, and 97 serve the town.

Commuter transportation is provided by New Jersey Transit's Pascack Valley Line at Nanuet, with service to Hoboken and connecting service to New York Penn Station. Tappan ZEExpress, operated by Transport of Rockland provides bus service from the Palisades Center in West Nyack and the Hudson Link bus in Central Nyack to the Tarrytown train station and the White Plains TransCenter. In addition, Rockland Coaches provides express service to the Port Authority Bus Terminal in New York City from Park-and-Ride and other pickup locations in New City, Bardonia, West Nyack, and Nanuet via Route 49 and 49J, and local service to New York from New City, Valley Cottage, and Upper Nyack on Routes 9A, 9T, and 20.

Education 
The town of Clarkstown is served by several school districts. The majority of the town is served by the Clarkstown Central School District, which educates students in New City, Bardonia, Congers, and West Nyack. The village of Upper Nyack as well as the hamlets of Valley Cottage and Central Nyack are served by the Nyack Public Schools, while the Hamlet of Nanuet is served by the Nanuet Union Free School District. A small portion on the western town border is served by the East Ramapo Central School District.

High schools located in the town include Clarkstown South High School in West Nyack, Clarkstown North High School in New City, Nyack Senior High School in Upper Nyack, and Nanuet Senior High School in Nanuet.

 Clarkstown Central School District
 In 2015 U.S. News & World Report ranked Clarkstown North Senior High School with a Silver award as the 135 Best High School in New York State and 1,329 nationally
 In 2017 U.S. News & World Report ranked Clarkstown South Senior High School with a Silver award as the 116 Best High School in New York State and 1,219 nationally.
 In 2017 U.S. News & World Report ranked Clarkstown North Senior High School with a Silver award as the 117 Best High School in New York State and 1,224 nationally.
 In 2018, ranked 78 Best School Districts in Clarkstown by Niche's.

Communities and locations in Clarkstown, NY 

Bardonia – A hamlet east of Spring Valley.
Brownsell Corners – A hamlet in the north part of the town, now considered a part of New City.
Centenary – A hamlet near the north town line, now the north-easternmost side of New City. 
Central Nyack – A hamlet on the south town line.
Congers – A hamlet in the eastern part of the town.
Lake DeForest – A long lake with a north–south orientation.
High Tor State Park – A state park along the northern town line.
Germonds – A location south of New City.
Hook Mountain State Park – A state park in the eastern part of the town.
Lake Lucille – A location in the northern part of the town.
Mount Ivy – A hamlet on the northern town line.
Nanuet – A hamlet.
New City – A hamlet that is the county seat.
New City Condominiums– A neighborhood near the center of New City.
New City Park – A community in South New City.
Nyack Beach State Park – A state park near the Hudson River.
Oakbrook – A hamlet east of Spring Valley
Rockland Lake – A hamlet located west of a lake of the same name.
Rockland Lake State Park – A state park in the eastern part of the town.
Spring Valley – A village, the eastern portion of which is within the town.
Upper Nyack – A village north of Nyack.
Valley Cottage – A hamlet in the eastern part of the town.
West Nyack – A hamlet west of Nyack village.

Rankings

CNN Money 
In 2008, CNNMoney.com named Clarkstown the 71st best small "city" to live in America.
In 2010, CNNMoney.com named Clarkstown the 41st best small "city" to live in America, which was the highest such ranking in New York.
In 2012, CNNMoney.com named Clarkstown the 35th best small "city" to live in America.
In 2014, CNNMoney.com named Clarkstown the 7th best small "city" to live in America.
 In 2016, CNNMoney.com named Clarkstown the 7th best small "city" to live in America.
 In 2019, CNNMoney.com named Clarkstown the 91st best small "city" to live in America.
 In 2021, CNNMoney.com named Clarkstown the 49th best small "city" to live in America.

CQ Press Crime ranking 

In 2005, it was named by Morgan Quitno the second safest city in the United States whose population is greater than 75,000 as well as the second safest overall from over 369 cities. This was the fifth year in a row in which Clarkstown made it within the top five and top ten respectively in these categories.

In 2007, Clarkstown was once again named the second safest city in the United States, in the 14th annual "2007 – 2008 City Crime Rankings" published by CQ Press – formally known as Morgan Quitno, a unit of Congressional Quarterly Inc. It was based on the FBI's September 24, 2007, crime statistics report which looked at 378 municipal areas with at least 75,000 people based on per-capita rates for homicide, rape, robbery, aggravated assault, burglary and auto theft.

In 2008, Clarkstown was named the 6th safest city in the United States in the 15th annual "2008 – 2009 City Crime Rankings" published by CQ Press.

In 2009, Clarkstown was named the 7th safest city in the United States in the 16th annual "2009 – 2010 City Crime Rankings" published by CQ Press.

In 2010, Clarkstown was named the 5th safest city in the United States in the 17th annual "2010 – 2011 City Crime Rankings" published by CQ Press.

In 2011, Clarkstown was named the 7th safest city in the United States in the 18th annual "2011 – 2012 City Crime Rankings" published by CQ Press.

In 2012, Clarkstown was named the 8th safest city in the United States in the 19th annual "2012 – 2013 City Crime Rankings" published by CQ Press.

In 2013, Clarkstown was named the 8th safest city in the United States in the 20th annual "2013 – 2014 City Crime Rankings" published by CQ Press.

However, these rankings are highly controversial, because of their source. In October 2007 the American Society of Criminology, the United States Conference of Mayors, and the Federal Bureau of Investigation requested that the publisher reconsider the promotion of the book – specifically, "their inaccurate and inflammatory press release labeling cities as 'safest' and 'most dangerous'" – because the rankings are "baseless and damaging."

Educational ranking
In 2015 U.S. News & World Report ranked Clarkstown South Senior High School with a silver award as the 128 Best High School in New York State and 1,233 nationally.

In 2015 U.S. News & World Report ranked Clarkstown North Senior High School with a silver award as the 135 Best High School in New York State and 1,329 nationally.

Clarkstown Going Green
Clarkstown has taken steps towards "going green" by conducting energy audits, purchasing Energy Star office equipment and using green cleaning products in town facilities. Other steps included:
2005 – Purchasing 10% of the energy used by town government from wind and solar sources.
2006 – Passing a tree preservation law.
2007 – Purchasing hybrid vehicles and smaller cars.
2008 – Installing energy-efficient lighting (LED) at its parks and recreation building with sensors that automatically turn off lights when no motion is detected.
2012- Solar Field installed on capped Town Landfill (Dedicated in 2014). It is the first Solar Field on a capped landfill in New York State. Proposed by then Councilman, George Hoehmann.
2013- Town participated in the NYSDEC Climate Smart Communities program in developing resiliency and climate action plans.
2016- Town purchases street lights from Orange and Rockland Utilities and begins converting to LED (Conversion completed in 2018).

Climate Action and Sustainability Planning - Training and Outreach
Beginning in 2014, Town Planners, along with representatives from other Town Departments, attended an initial training workshop held by the consulting firm of Vanasse Hangen Brustlin, Inc. (VHB), who is being funded by the New York State Department of Environmental Conservation specifically to help communities attain their goals as Climate Smart Communities.  Town Planners participated in a series of workshops with VHB through February 2015 to begin the process of identifying ways to reduce the Town's greenhouse gas emissions.  
In addition, the Clarkstown Planning Department, along with other Town Departments, participated in the New York Rising Community Reconstruction Program.  This is a separate initiative funded by the New York State Department of State to aid in the development of resilient and sustainable communities. As part of this New York Rising Program the consulting firm AKRF, Inc. worked with the Town to identify areas of the Town which are vulnerable to storm damage and to formulate a plan and provide funding to address these issues.  
Participation in these initiatives and the products generated will serve as the foundations of the Climate Action and Sustainability Plan, which will be incorporated into the first update of the Town's Comprehensive Plan, Clarkstown 2020.  Additionally, workshops were held throughout the Town's hamlets to begin gathering input and formulate direction for the Clarkstown 2020 update.

US Supreme Court case 
In 1994, Clarkstown was involved in litigation that challenged a town ordinance, that required all waste picked up in the town to be sorted for recyclables at a specific privately operated facility.  The case made it to the United States Supreme Court in C&A Carbone, Inc. v. Town of Clarkstown, in which the ordinance was held unconstitutional.

References

External links 
 

Towns in Rockland County, New York
New York (state) populated places on the Hudson River
1791 establishments in New York (state)